Torbenella is a genus of squat lobsters in the family Munididae, containing the following species:
 Torbenella calvata (Macpherson, 2006)
 Torbenella insolita (Macpherson, 2004)
 Torbenella orbis (Baba, 2005)

References

External links

Squat lobsters